Divorce Made Easy is a 1929 American Pre-Code sound comedy film directed by Neal Burns and Walter Graham and written by Alfred A. Cohn, Wilson Collison, and Garrett Graham. The film stars Douglas MacLean, Marie Prevost, Johnny Arthur, Frances Lee, Dot Farley, and Jack Duffy. The film was released on July 6, 1929, by Paramount Pictures.

Cast 
Douglas MacLean as Billy Haskell
Marie Prevost as Mabel Deering
Johnny Arthur as Percy Deering
Frances Lee as Eileen Stanley
Dot Farley	as Aunt Emma
Jack Duffy as Uncle Todd
Buddy Wattles as Jerry
Hal Wilson as Parkins

References

External links 
 

1929 films
American comedy films
1929 comedy films
Paramount Pictures films
American black-and-white films
1920s English-language films
1920s American films